Thierry Oleksiak (born 11 September 1961) is a French professional football manager and former player who works as an assistant coach at Ligue 1 club Paris Saint-Germain, under the direction of head coach Christophe Galtier. As a player, Oleksiak was a defensive midfielder and centre-back.

Club career 
Born in Saint-Étienne, Oleksiak began his career at his hometown club of Saint-Étienne. He played seven seasons for the club's first team from 1979 to 1986, winning the Division 1 title in the 1980–81 season. In 1986, he joined Nice, where he would play three seasons. In 1989, Oleksiak signed for Metz, before joining Lille in 1991. In 1993, he signed for Angers, where he met then-teammate Christophe Galtier; they would go on to work together extensively as coaches in the 21st century. In the 1993–94 season with Angers, Oleksiak suffered relegation from the Division 1. The season was also his final as a professional, as he joined amateur side Aurillac in 1994.

International career 
Oleksiak represented France at under-21 level in the early 1980s, and made a total of twelve appearances for the team. France had already been eliminated in the race for qualification for the 1988 Summer Olympics, and lost the match to Sweden by a score of 2–1.

Coaching career 
In 1994, Oleksiak joined Aurillac as a player-manager. In 1997, he retired from playing, and became solely the manager of the team. From 1999 to 2000, Oleksiak worked as an assistant coach to his former Nice teammate René Marsiglia for Amiens, before returning to coach Aurillac in 2001. In 2008, Oleksiak joined Libourne Saint-Seurin (later renamed Libourne), where he was initially an assistant coach before becoming the head coach.

In 2012, Oleksiak returned to his hometown club Saint-Étienne, initially as a scout, before becoming the manager of the reserve team in 2013. In 2015, he joined his former Angers teammate Christophe Galtier's coaching staff in Sainté's first team as an assistant coach. Besides a small stint as an assistant coach for Chinese club Liaoning in 2017, Oleksiak followed Galtier to Lille, where he contributed to a Ligue 1 title in the 2020–21 season. In the 2021–22 season, Oleksiak was with Galtier at Nice. They both joined Paris Saint-Germain in July 2022.

Personal life 
Thierry's father  is also a former professional footballer. They both played for Saint-Étienne and Lille in their careers. Jean's father, Thierry's grandfather, was a political refugee from Poland.

Honours

Player 
Saint-Étienne

 Division 1: 1980–81
 Coupe de France runner-up: 1980–81, 1981–82

Manager 
Aurillac

 Championnat National 3: 

Saint-Étienne B

 Championnat de France Amateur 2: 2013–14

Notes

References

External links 
 

1961 births
Living people
French footballers
Footballers from Saint-Étienne
French people of Polish descent
Association football midfielders
Association football central defenders
Olympic footballers of France
France youth international footballers
France under-21 international footballers
AS Saint-Étienne players
OGC Nice players
FC Metz players
Lille OSC players
Angers SCO players
FC Aurillac Arpajon Cantal Auvergne players
French Division 3 (1971–1993) players
Ligue 1 players
Ligue 2 players
Championnat National 3 players
Championnat National 2 players
French football managers
Association football coaches
Association football scouts
Association football player-managers
FC Aurillac Arpajon Cantal Auvergne managers
Amiens SC players
FC Libourne non-playing staff
FC Libourne managers
AS Saint-Étienne non-playing staff
Liaoning F.C. non-playing staff
Lille OSC non-playing staff
OGC Nice non-playing staff
Paris Saint-Germain F.C. non-playing staff
Championnat National 3 managers
French expatriate football managers
Expatriate football managers in China
French expatriate sportspeople in China